Allen Covington Morris (December 3, 1909 – April 22, 2002), a distinguished historian and writer, was Clerk of the Florida House of Representatives and Historian of the Florida Legislature. Starting in 1947, he wrote The Florida Handbook then updated it annually and in 1974 wrote Florida Place Names as well as subsequent revisions. He also wrote other books on Florida history and government. In 1952, Morris established the Florida Photographic Collection, now part of the Florida State Archives.

Awards
February 23, 1972, was proclaimed by the Florida Legislature to be "Allen Morris Day".
The main House committee auditorium, which is the largest committee room in the House Office Building, was renamed "Morris Hall" in 1977.
The Florida Bicentennial Commission named him as a "Florida Patriot".

References

20th-century American historians
20th-century American male writers
1909 births
2002 deaths
Historians from Florida
Legislative clerks
Historians of Florida
American male non-fiction writers